The 1965 California Angels season was the fifth year of play for the American Major League Baseball franchise. The 1965 Angels finished seventh in the American League with a record of 75 wins and 87 losses, putting them 27 games behind the AL Champion Minnesota Twins. It was also the final season for the franchise in the city of Los Angeles before moving to their new stadium in nearby Anaheim for the following season. In their fourth and last year as tenants at Chávez Ravine, the Angels drew only 566,727 fans, eighth in the ten-team Junior Circuit and almost two million fans fewer than their landlords, the Dodgers, who were en route to the 1965 world championship.

Midseason name change
The 1965 Angels are the only team in 20th century Major League Baseball history to undergo an in-season name change. The club began the season under its original identity, the Los Angeles Angels, but with the imminent move to Anaheim, owner Gene Autry changed the name of the team to the California Angels — effective immediately — on September 2, 1965, with only 28 games left in the season.

The name change was reflected in the Angels' new caps, on which an interlocking "CA" in fancy block letters replaced the former interlocking "LA". The new caps retained the distinctive white halo around the navy-blue crown. Because the team's home and road uniforms of the time simply read "ANGELS" across the shirtfront, they did not change.

Offseason 
 October 14, 1964: The Angels traded a player to be named later to the Milwaukee Braves for Phil Roof and Ron Piché. The Angels completed the deal by sending Dan Osinski to the Braves on November 29.
 December 3, 1964: Bo Belinsky was traded by the Angels to the Philadelphia Phillies for Rudy May and Costen Shockley.
 Prior to 1965 season: Bob Smith was signed as a free agent by the Angels.

Regular season

Season standings

Record vs. opponents

Notable transactions 
 May 13, 1965: Merritt Ranew was purchased by the Angels from the San Francisco Giants.
 June 8, 1965: Joe Henderson was drafted by the Angels in the 5th round of the 1965 Major League Baseball draft.
 June 15, 1965: Phil Roof was traded by the Angels to the Cleveland Indians for a player to be named later and cash. The Indians completed the deal by sending Bubba Morton to the Angels on September 15, 1965.

Roster

Player stats

Batting

Starters by position 
Note: Pos = Position; G = Games played; AB = At bats; H = Hits; Avg. = Batting average; HR = Home runs; RBI = Runs batted in

Other batters 
Note: G = Games played; AB = At bats; H = Hits; Avg. = Batting average; HR = Home runs; RBI = Runs batted in

Pitching

Starting pitchers 
Note: G = Games pitched; IP = Innings pitched; W = Wins; L = Losses; ERA = Earned run average; SO = Strikeouts

Other pitchers 
Note: G = Games pitched; IP = Innings pitched; W = Wins; L = Losses; ERA = Earned run average; SO = Strikeouts

Relief pitchers 
Note: G = Games pitched; W = Wins; L = Losses; SV = Saves; ERA = Earned run average; SO = Strikeouts

Farm system

Notes

References 
1965 California Angels team at Baseball-Reference
1965 California Angels team page at www.baseball-almanac.com

Los Angeles Angels seasons
California Angels season
Los